Dolichorhynchops is an extinct genus of polycotylid plesiosaur from the Late Cretaceous (early Turonian to late Campanian stage) of North America, containing three species, D. osborni, D. bonneri and D. tropicensis, as well as a questionably referred fourth species, D. herschelensis. Dolichorhynchops was a prehistoric marine reptile, but at least one species, D. tropicensis, likely entered rivers to collect gastroliths. Its Greek generic name means "long-nosed face".

Discovery and species

D. osborni

The holotype specimen of Dolichorhynchops osborni, KUVP 1300, was discovered in the upper Smoky Hill Chalk Logan County, Kansas, by George F. Sternberg, as a teenager, in around 1900. The remains were collected by him and his father, Charles H. Sternberg, and then sold to the University of Kansas (Lawrence, Kansas). KUVP 1300 was prepared and mounted by H.T. Martin under the supervision of Dr. Samuel Wendell Williston, who described and named it in 1902. A more detailed description and photographs were provided by ).

In 1918, Charles H. Sternberg found a large mosasaur, Tylosaurus, with the remains of a plesiosaur in its stomach. The mosasaur specimen is currently mounted in the United States National Museum (Smithsonian) and the plesiosaur remains are stored in the collections. It is the basis for the story line in the 2007 National Geographic IMAX documentary Sea Monsters: A Prehistoric Adventure, and a book by the same name  .

George Sternberg found a second, less complete specimen of D.osborni in 1926. In his effort to sell the specimen to a museum, Sternberg took detailed photographs of the skull. The specimen was eventually mounted in plaster and was acquired by the Harvard Museum of Comparative Zoology. MCZ 1064 was on display there until some time in the 1950s. (See also )

The skull was crushed flat but is in very good condition. Note that it was described by Bonner as "Trinacromerum osborni" which was the accepted genus name at the time.

Until recently, all known specimens of D. osborni in Kansas had been collected from the upper layers of the Smoky Hill Chalk (Campanian age).  reported the first remains from the lower chalk (Late Coniacian-Santonian in age). In 2005, the remains of the earliest known D. osborni were discovered in the Fort Hays Limestone, Niobrara Formation in Jewell County, Kansas. This is the first record of a polycotylid plesiosaur in this formation.

D. bonneri

Two very large specimens of a polycotylid plesiosaur (KUVP 40001 and 40002) were collected from the Pierre Shale of Wyoming and later reported on by Adams in her 1977 Masters thesis. Later (1997), she officially described (1997) as a new species of Trinacromerum (T. bonneri). Unknown to her at the time, Carpenter (1996) had revised the Polycotylidae and separated Dolichorhynchops from Trinacromerum, raising the question as to whether or not the specimens represented a separate species or just larger individuals of D. osborni.

D. herschelensis

D. herschelensis was described as a new species by Tamaki Sato in 2005. It was discovered in the Bearpaw Formation of Saskatchewan, Canada, a Late Cretaceous (late Campanian to Maastrichtian) rock formation. The fossil was found close to the town of Herschel in south-western Saskatchewan, from which the species name is derived. The rock formation it was found in consists of sandstones, mudstones and shales laid down in the Western Interior Seaway, just before it began to revert to dry land.

The type specimen of D. herschelensis was discovered in a disarticulated state (i.e. the bones were scattered about the discovery site). The skull, lower jaw, ribs, pelvis and shoulder blades were all recovered, but the spine was incomplete, so the exact number of vertebrae the living animal would have had is unknown. All four limbs are missing, with the exception of 9 small Phalanges (finger bones) and a small number of limb bones found close by which may belong to the animal in question.

The specimen is believed to be an adult, due to the fusion of certain bones (it is generally assumed—not necessarily strictly correctly so—that other animals' skulls, much as humans', consist of dissociated bones interconnected by cartilage fontanelles that do not entirely close until full maturity). It is also believed to have been substantially smaller than its close relative, D. osborni, as some juvenile specimens of D. osborni are larger than the adult specimen of D. herschelensis. The snout is long and thin, with numerous tooth sockets. However, very few of the thin, sharp teeth remain.

D. tropicensis
D. tropicensis was first named by Rebecca Schmeisser McKean in 2011. The specific name is derived from the name of the Tropic Shale, in which the two specimens of D. tropicensis were found. It was collected by the Museum of Northern Arizona from a single locality within the Tropic Shale of Utah, dating to the early Turonian stage of the early Late Cretaceous, about 93.5-91 million years ago. D. tropicensis extends the known stratigraphic range for Dolichorhynchops back by approximately 7 million years. Previously three additional polycotylid taxa, Eopolycotylus, Palmulasaurus and Trinacromerum, have been named from the same formation, two of which are currently endemic to the Tropic Shale. 

The holotype is associated with 289 gastroliths, which is unusual in comparison to most polycotylid skeletons that generally lack gastroliths. Ranging from less than 0.1 grams to 18.5 grams, the total mass of the gastroliths was about 518 grams. About three-quarters of the stones weighed less than 2 grams, with the mean mass and median mass of the stones respectively estimated at 1.9 grams and 0.8 grams. The gastroliths had high mean value and variability in sphericity, suggesting that this individual was obtaining its stones from rivers located along the western side of the Western Interior Seaway.

Classification

Below is a cladogram of polycotylid relationships from Ketchum & Benson, 2011.

See also

 List of plesiosaur genera
 Timeline of plesiosaur research

Notes

References

 
 
 
 
 
 
 
 
  (abstract)
 
 
 
 
 
 
 
 

Late Cretaceous plesiosaurs of North America
Fossil taxa described in 1902
Polycotylids
Taxa named by Samuel Wendell Williston
Sauropterygian genera